Fashion, Faith, and Fantasy in the New Physics of the Universe  is a book by mathematical physicist Roger Penrose, released in September 2016. The book is based on his lectures that he gave at Princeton University in 2003.

Reception
A reviewer of Publishers Weekly stated "Acclaimed English mathematical physicist Penrose ... gets to the heart of modern physics’ problem with subjectivity in this insightful and provocative pop-sci title... He writes with clarity and authority in this dense but rewarding discussion of scientific stumbles in the search for truth." Graham Farmelo of The Guardian commented "It seems from Faith, Fashion and Fantasy that Penrose has not felt comfortable with any of the radical new ideas in fundamental physics that have been set out in the past 40 years."

References

External links
 Penrose, R.: Fashion, Faith, and Fantasy in the New Physics of the Universe - Illustrations
 Roger Penrose - Fashion, Faith and Fantasy - Lecture 1, YouTube. Oct 15, 2016

2016 non-fiction books
Princeton University Press books
Popular physics books
Works by Roger Penrose